The Quinebaug Highlands are a 172,000 acre region of mountains surrounding the Connecticut/Massachusetts border near Ashford, Eastford, Union, and Woodstock in Connecticut and Southbridge and Sturbridge in Massachusetts.  It includes over  acres of protected forest. The highlands are the source for several rivers, including the Quinebaug River, and are part of the Quinebaug and Shetucket Rivers Valley National Heritage Corridor.

The highest elevation is  Burley Hill in Union, CT.

Recreational Opportunities
The highlands many protected area offer opportunities for hiking, canoeing, kayaking, hunting and fishing.  It is one of the few areas in Connecticut that offers back country camping.

Mountains and protected areas of the Quinebaug Highlands
 Bigelow Hollow State Park
 Brimfield State Forest
 Burley Hill
 East Brimfield Lake
 Natchaug State Forest
 Nipmuck State Forest
 Norcross Wildlife Sanctuary
 Snow Hill
 Streeter Point Recreation Area
 Wells State Park
 Westville Lake
 Yale-Myers Forest

References

Geography of Hampden County, Massachusetts
Geography of Tolland County, Connecticut
Geography of Windham County, Connecticut
Geography of Worcester County, Massachusetts
Tourist attractions in Hampden County, Massachusetts
Tourist attractions in Tolland County, Connecticut
Tourist attractions in Windham County, Connecticut
Tourist attractions in Worcester County, Massachusetts
Highlands